Adromischus marianiae is a species of succulent plants in the genus Adromischus belonging to the family Crassulaceae.

Description
This perennial succulent and slow-growing subshrub has usually thin and short branches and forms a small cluster of rough, warty and nearly spherical leaves resembling dried raisins, quite variable in colour but usually green or red-brown or purplish, up to  3.5 cm long. Flowers are green with a pinkish nuance, about 12 mm long.

Cultivation 
A. marianiae requires bright light and should not be overwatered. It typically struggles at temperatures below 5°C.

Distribution
This plant is native to South Africa and Namibia.

Habitat
Adromischus marianiae grows on granite hills, sometimes inside the cracks of the rocks and in the shade of bushes.

Varieties
 Adromischus marianiae var. immaculatus
 Adromischus marianiae var. herrei

Cultivars 

 Adromischus marianiae 'Alveolatus'
 Adromischus marianiae 'Antidorcatum'
 Adromischus marianiae 'Bryan Makin'
 Adromischus marianiae 'Herrei'
 Adromischus marianiae 'Little Spheroid'
 Adromischus marianiae 'Red Mutation'
 Adromischus marianiae 'Tanqua'

References

 The Plant List
 Cactus-art.biz
 Crassulaceae
 Desert-tropicals
 A. herrei on Desert Tropical
 Elite-pets
 Urs Eggli Illustrated Handbook of Succulent Plants: Crassulaceae

External links

marianae
Plants described in 1930